Kalk is a surname. Notable people with the surname include:

Brian Kalk (born c. 1966), American civil servant
Curt Kalk, American politician
Jay Kalk (born 1975), American musician
Stanton Frederick Kalk (1894–1917), United States Navy officer

See also

Kali (name)